WWLF-LD is a television station in Syracuse, New York. The station, owned by Metro TV Inc. (one of many companies majority-owned by Craig Fox), broadcasts on UHF channel 35.

The original construction permit was issued to Craig Fox himself in June 1988, with a major modification filing the year after, and the first broadcast commenced in May 1991. The then-WOBX-LP was affiliated with The Box and then MTV2 after The Box ceased operations in 2001. WOBX-LP acquired the Univision affiliation as a Syracuse translator (relay) station for WNYI channel 52 in Ithaca until WNYI was bought by a religious broadcaster and subsequently dropped the Univision network. WWLF-LD is now the AMGTV affiliate for the Syracuse market.

References

External links

Television channels and stations established in 1991
WLF-LD
1991 establishments in New York (state)
Low-power television stations in the United States